Anthony James Trewavas (born 1939)  FRS FRSE is Emeritus Professor in the School of Biological Sciences of the University of Edinburgh best known for his research in the fields of plant physiology and molecular biology. His research investigates plant behaviour.

Education and early life
Trewavas was born in 1939 and educated at John Roans Grammar School, Blackheath, London which he left in 1958 with five A levels. He obtained both his undergraduate degree and Ph.D in Biochemistry at University College London investigating aspects of phosphate metabolism of plants, with special reference to the action of growth hormones on Avena.

Career
Following his PhD, Trewavas did his postdoctoral research at the newly constituted University of East Anglia. He moved to the University of Edinburgh in 1970 and was Professor of Plant Biochemistry 1990–2004. In 1972 he was invited to be first Visiting Professor at the prestigious Plant Research laboratory in Michigan State University. At the time this  laboratory was regarded as the foremost laboratory dealing with plant research. He also, after invitation, spent periods of time as Visiting Professor at other Universities in the Americas and Europe usually providing up to 20 lectures. He is the author of some 250  scientific papers and three books both as editor and author. He was made Professor Emeritus in the University of Edinburgh in 2004.

Research
Plant behaviour is simply the response of plants to environmental problems or change. His main research contribution as the leader of the Edinburgh Molecular Signalling Group, has been in the role of calcium in signal transduction during plant development. 
Although Trewavas has done significant research of plant molecular mechanisms and signaling, his true fascination was with whole plant behaviour. In 1972 he picked up a book titled General Systems Theory by Ludwig von Bertalanffy about systems theory, which would have a profound influence on this view of biology. It dictated that biology was constructed from systems or network which were all interconnected and these connections gave rise to novel properties of organisms and populations. At a time when most scientists, including himself, were reductionists, this approach was very controversial. Trewavas's articles with his new perspective were ridiculed, and even led to his promotion being temporarily blocked. His inspiration to pursue plant intelligence came from Barbara McClintock, who he mentions multiple times in his 2014 book Plant Behaviour and Intelligence.

He is a past or present member of the editorial boards of the publications, Trends in Plant Science, Botanica Acta, Plant Physiology, What's New in Plant Physiology, The Biochemical Journal, Molecular Plant, Plant Signaling and Behavior, Plant, Cell & Environment.

Evidence to Parliament
Professor Trewavas submitted written evidence to the Science and Technology Select Committee of the UK Parliament in April 2013. He summarized his evidence as follows:

 The difference between projection and prediction
 The necessity of scepticism in climate science and the difficulties in testing climate models
 Whether CO2 increase is the driver of climate temperature or is it the reverse?
 I conclude that a lack of certainty should lead to removal of legislation

Publications

Awards and honours
He is an elected Fellow of the Royal Society of Edinburgh (FRSE, 1993), the Royal Society of Arts (FRSA, 1995), the Royal Society  (FRS, 1999), the Centre for Future Studies (2001). He is also a member of the Academia Europaea in 2002 and received the "corresponding membership" award from the American Society of Plant Biologists in 1999, a prize given to one non-US biologist per year. He is named by the Institute for Scientific Information as in the most highly cited author group in the field of animal and plant Sciences.

References

Living people
Academics of the University of Edinburgh
Fellows of the Royal Society of Edinburgh
Fellows of the Royal Society
People educated at the John Roan School
1939 births
Plant cognition